E. salicifolia may refer to:
 Eremosis salicifolia, a plant species in the genus Eremosis
 Euphorbia salicifolia, a plant species in the genus Euphorbia

See also
 Salicifolia (disambiguation)